The Piano Tuner is a historical novel by Daniel Mason, set in British India and Burma. It was first published in 2002 when Mason was 26 and was his first novel.

The Piano Tuner was the basis for a 2004 opera of the same name (composed by Nigel Osborne to a libretto by Amanda Holden) and is also due to be released as a film directed by Charlie Stratton. The film is to be produced by Mulberry Films LLC, Latitude Media & BCDF.

Synopsis

The novel is set in 1886, in the jungles of Burma. The protagonist, a middle-aged man by the name of Edgar Drake is commissioned by the British War Office to repair a rare Erard grand piano belonging to a Doctor Anthony Carroll. Carroll, who is the root of many myths, had the piano shipped to him as a means to bring peace and union amongst the princes in Burma in order to further the expansion of the British Empire. The extreme humidity of the tropical climate soon rendered it useless and horribly out of tune. Drake's "mission" thus becomes vital to the Crown's strategic interests. In a series of sub-plots and intrigue the surgeon-major is charged with treason. When the piano tuner goes to meet the surgeon-major against the wishes of the military staff, he finds himself suddenly surrounded.

Reception
The book has been thematically compared with Conrad's Heart of Darkness. Andrea Barrett, in The New York Times, called the book "thoroughly engaging" and said that the character of Drake was its greatest achievement, though both she, as well as Hermoine Lee in  The Guardian, said that the historical digressions in the book were "clumsy" or "sat stiffly".

Adaptations
The novel was adapted into an opera by Nigel Osborne, to a libretto by Amanda Holden, which premiered at the Linbury Studio of the Royal Opera House in 2004.

References

Novels about music
2003 American novels
Novels set in Myanmar
Fiction set in 1886
Novels set in the 1880s
Novels adapted into operas